{{Infobox musical composition
| name = The Dryad
| type = Tone poem
| composer = 
| image = Jean Sibelius (AE, 1904).png
| image_upright = 0.7
| caption = The composer in 1904, by 
| border = Yes
| native_name = | opus      = 45, No. 1
| performed = 
| duration = 
| movements = 
| scoring = orchestra
}}The Dryad, Op. 45 No. 1, is a tone poem  by Jean Sibelius. He completed it in early 1910 between skiing trips. He conducted the first performance in Kristiania (now Oslo), Norway, on 8 October 1910, together with the premiere of In Memoriam. He arranged it for piano in 1910 (''). The piece has been regarded as one of the composer's "shortest and most original orchestral works", as an "impressionist miniature", proceeding from fragments to a "dance-like theme".

Structure
The work is scored for piccolo, 2 flutes, 2 oboes, 2 clarinets (in B), bass clarinet (in B), 2 bassoons, 4 horns (in F), 3 trumpets (in B), 3 trombones, tuba, tambourine, castanets, snare drum, bass drum and strings.

Literature
Tomi Mäkelä: "Jean Sibelius und seine Zeit" (German), Laaber-Verlag, Regensburg 2013

References

External links

Symphonic poems by Jean Sibelius
1910 compositions